is a Japanese footballer who plays for Gainare Tottori on loan from Cerezo Osaka.

Club statistics
Updated to 26 February 2019.

Reserves performance

Last Updated: 26 February 2019

References

External links

Profile at Cerezo Osaka

1993 births
Living people
Osaka University of Health and Sport Sciences alumni
Association football people from Nara Prefecture
Japanese footballers
J2 League players
J3 League players
Cerezo Osaka players
Cerezo Osaka U-23 players
FC Imabari players
SC Sagamihara players
Gainare Tottori players
Association football forwards
Universiade bronze medalists for Japan
Universiade medalists in football